"I Want to Come Over" is a song by American singer-songwriter Melissa Etheridge. It was released in late January 1996 as the second single from her fifth studio album, Your Little Secret (1995). The song was a commercial success, reaching number 22 on the US Billboard Hot 100 and number 29 in both Australia and New Zealand. It also reached number one on the Canadian RPM Top Singles chart in March 1996. At the end of the year, the song appeared on the American and Canadian year-end charts at numbers 79 and 11, respectively.

Critical reception
Larry Flick from Billboard felt that the song "should ignite across-the-board radio interest, much in the same way as the mega "Come To My Window" did." He added, "Tortured romance is what Etheridge does best, and she offers up a heaping dose of sexually charged tension and yearning—topped with just enough philosophical focus to drive the song to its necessary climax. Rockers will dig the now-familiar blend of Etheridge's growl and the clang of guitars, while popsters will find the hook top tasty for words."

Music video
The accompanying music video for "I Want to Come Over", directed by Pam Thomas, was shot on-location at an old hotel in Los Angeles, California. Actress Gwyneth Paltrow stars in the video. In the clip, Paltrow drives to her lover's apartment, sits outside in her car and breaks down, before collecting herself and going inside the apartment building. The video is interspersed with scenes of Etheridge performing in the hotel's lobby.

The hotel had one resident still living in the building at the time of the shoot. To keep him out of the areas of the building where they were filming, the director and crew gave the man a bottle of Chivas Regal whiskey.

Track listings

 US CD and cassette single
 "I Want to Come Over"
 "Your Little Secret"

 US 7-inch single
A. "I Want to Come Over"
B. "I'm the Only One"

 European CD single
 "I Want to Come Over"
 "Your Little Secret"
 "Let Me Go" (live)
 "Must Be Crazy for Me" (live)

Charts

Weekly charts

Year-end charts

References

1995 songs
1996 singles
Island Records singles
Melissa Etheridge songs
RPM Top Singles number-one singles
Song recordings produced by Hugh Padgham
Songs written by Melissa Etheridge